R2, R02, R.II, R.2 or R-2 may refer to:

Entertainment
 R2 (Rock'n'Reel), a British music magazine
 R2-D2, a character from Star Wars films and books, nickname R2
 Code Geass: Lelouch of the Rebellion R2, a 2008 anime series
 Resistance 2, a video game
 Relapse 2, a 2009 album by rapper Eminem
 Patricio Rey y sus Redonditos de Ricota or R2, an Argentine rock band
 Region 2, a DVD region code

Science and technology
  R2 or r2 (pronounced R-square), the coefficient of determination of a linear regression in statistics
 R2, the two-dimensional real coordinate space in mathematics
 R2: Risk of explosion by shock, friction, fire or other sources of ignition, a risk phrase in chemistry
 R2 RNA element, a cis-acting element identified in R2 retrotransposons which is involved in priming the reverse transcription process 
 ATC code R02 Throat preparations, a section of the Anatomical Therapeutic Chemical Classification System
 Haplogroup R2 (Y-DNA), a human Y-chromosome haplogroup
 receptor 2, the second in line of a series of cellular receptors, generally at the end of an acronym
 Gangrene (ICD-10 code)
 Robonaut 2, a NASA humanoid robotic development project
 R2 signalling, a family of telephony protocols for line and register signalling

Computing
 .r02, a RAR file extension
 Radare2, an open source reverse engineering framework also known as r2

Transportation
 R2 (Rodalies de Catalunya), a commuter rail line in Barcelona, Catalonia, Spain

 Wilmington/Newark Line (R2 Wilmington/Newark line)
 Warminster Line (R2 Warminster line)
 Radial Road 2 or R-2, an arterial road of Manila, Philippines
 Autopista Radial R-2, a Spanish radial motorway connecting Madrid to Guadalajara and passing through Alcobendas and connecting to N-320
 R2 expressway (Slovakia)
 Orenburg Airlines (IATA code)

Vehicles
 R2, a sub-class of Group R rally cars
 DFW R.II, a 1918 German bomber aircraft
 Fiat R.2, a 1919 Italian reconnaissance aircraft 
 HMS Zest (R02), a World War II British Royal Navy Z-class destroyer
 Jaguar R2, Jaguar Racing's car for the 2001 Formula One season
 Linke-Hofmann R.II, a World War I German bomber aircraft
 ORA R2, a Chinese electric city car
 Panzer 35(t), a Czech tank whose Romanian model was known as the R-2.
 Polikarpov R-2, a Soviet Union copy of the 1931 British Airco DH.9A light bomber aircraft
 Ross R-2 Ibis, a glider
 Subaru R2, a 2003 Japanese car
 USS R-2 (SS-79), a 1918 R-class coastal and harbor defense submarine of the US Navy

Other uses
 BBC Radio 2, a British radio station
 R-2 (missile), an improved version of German V-2 rocket manufactured by the Soviet Union
 R2 is a rank of United States research university in the Carnegie Classification of Institutions of Higher Education

See also
 Windows Server 2003 R2
 Windows Server 2008 R2
 SQL Server 2008 R2
 R–2R ladder, a resistor ladder